The 2021 Men's South American Volleyball Championship was the 34th edition of the Men's South American Volleyball Championship, organised by South America's governing volleyball body, the Confederación Sudamericana de Voleibol (CSV). The tournament was held in Brasília, Brazil from 1 to 5 September 2021. The champions and runners up, qualified for the 2022 FIVB Volleyball Men's World Championship.

Teams 
The tournament was held with 5 teams, after the withdrawal of Venezuela due to COVID-19 pandemic issues.

*.

Venues

* The matches were held without public due to COVID-19 pandemic restrictions.

Pool standing procedure
 Number of matches won
 Match points
 Sets ratio
 Points ratio
 If the tie continues as per the point ratio between two teams, the priority will be given to the team which won the last match between them. When the tie in points ratio is between three or more teams, a new classification of these teams in the terms of points 1, 2 and 3 will be made taking into consideration only the matches in which they were opposed to each other.

Match won 3–0 or 3–1: 3 match points for the winner, 0 match points for the loser
Match won 3–2: 2 match points for the winner, 1 match point for the loser

Round robin
All times are Brasília Time (UTC−03:00).

|}

|}

Final standing

Awards

Most Valuable Player
 Bruno Rezende
Best Setter
 Bruno Rezende
Best Outside Spikers
 Ricardo Lucarelli
 Vicente Parraguirre

Best Middle Blockers
 Agustín Loser
 Martín Ramos
Best Opposite Spiker
 Liberman Agámez
Best Libero
 Santiago Danani

See also

South American Women's Volleyball Championship
Men's U23 South American Volleyball Championship
Men's Junior South American Volleyball Championship
Boys' Youth South American Volleyball Championship
Boys' U17 South American Volleyball Championship
Volleyball at the Pan American Games
Men's Pan-American Volleyball Cup
Women's Pan-American Volleyball Cup

References

External links
Official website

Men's South American Volleyball Championships
South American Volleyball Championship
Sport in Brasília
2021 in Brazilian sport
Temuco
International volleyball competitions hosted by Chile
2021 in South American sport
South American Volleyball Championship
South American Volleyball Championship